Aldo Haïk (born 17 April 1952) is a French chess International Master (IM) (1977), two-times French Chess Championship winner (1972, 1983), Chess Olympiad individual gold medal winner (1972), World Team Chess Championship individual bronze medal winner (1985).

Biography
In the 1970s and 1980s Aldo Haïk was one of the leading French chess players. He twice winning gold medal in French Chess Championship: in 1972 in Rosny-sous-Bois and in 1983 in Belfort. In 1977, he was awarded the FIDE International Master (IM) title. In 1985, he was the first French player to earn a chess grandmaster norm. Aldo Haïk has successfully participated in international chess tournaments where he has won or shared 1st place: Berga (1976), Stara Zagora (1977), London (1978, 1979), Bagneux (1981), Metz (1995).

Aldo Haïk played for France in the Chess Olympiads:
 In 1972, at second reserve board in the 20th Chess Olympiad in Skopje (+11, =0, -1) and won individual gold medal,
 In 1978, at first board in the 23rd Chess Olympiad in Buenos Aires (+4, =4, -5),
 In 1980, at first board in the 24th Chess Olympiad in La Valletta (+5, =5, -3),
 In 1982, at first board in the 25th Chess Olympiad in Lucerne (+4, =2, -6),
 In 1984, at second board in the 26th Chess Olympiad in Thessaloniki (+4, =3, -5),
 In 1986, at second board in the 27th Chess Olympiad in Dubai (+4, =5, -2),
 In 1988, at first reserve board in the 28th Chess Olympiad in Thessaloniki (+5, =2, -2).

Aldo Haïk played for France in the World Team Chess Championship:
 In 1985, at third board in the 1st World Team Chess Championship in Lucerne (+5, =3, -1) and won individual bronze medal.

Aldo Haïk played for France in the European Team Chess Championship:
 In 1989, at sixth board in the 9th European Team Chess Championship in Haifa (+1, =1, -2).

Aldo Haïk played for France in the World Student Team Chess Championship:
 In 1974, at first board in the 20th World Student Team Chess Championship in Teesside (+6, =2, -3).

Aldo Haïk finished his professional chess career in the early 1990s. He worked as a chess editor for the newspaper Le Figaro. Aldo Haïk has written several books on chess:
 Les Échecs, 4 tournois pour un titre, Un jeune français maître international, Aldo Haïk, Hatier, 1978
 Le Jeu d'échecs, c'est facile, 1982
 Les Échecs spectaculaires: 150 chefs-d'œuvre de l'histoire des échecs; Parties, études, problèmes, 1984

References

External links

Aldo Haïk chess games at 365chess.com

1952 births
Living people
Sportspeople from Tunis
French chess players
French chess writers
Chess International Masters
Chess Olympiad competitors